Gebhardshain is a municipality in the district of Altenkirchen, in Rhineland-Palatinate, Germany. It is situated in the Westerwald, approx. 20 km south-west of Siegen. Gebhardshain was the seat of the former Verbandsgemeinde ("collective municipality") Gebhardshain.

Gebhardshain was mentioned for the first time in the year 1220.
Gebhardshain belonged at that time to the nobility of those from Gervertzhagen and was assigned to the territory of the count von Sayn.

In 1378, these recognized prince elector of Trier as their liege lord. Therefore, Gebhardshain belonged both to the diocese Trier and to the archbishop's secular barony.

Since 1990, there is a partnership with the municipality Kreuzebra.

References

Altenkirchen (district)